Malham Dar (also Romanized as Malḩam Dar) is a village in Hendudur Rural District, Sarband District, Shazand County, Markazi Province, Iran. At the 2006 census, its population was 79, in 17 families.

References 

Populated places in Shazand County